Hesilrige is a surname. Notable people with the surname include:

Thomas Hesilrige (disambiguation), multiple people
Arthur Hesilrige (1601–1661)

See also
Baron Hazlerigg